The Faculty of Arts & Science is a division of the University of Toronto (U of T) which offers arts and science teaching and research institutions. With almost 27,000 undergraduate and 3,000 graduate students, Arts & Science represents over half the student population on the downtown campus.

Overview
The Faculty of Arts & Science hosts 73 per cent of the university's undergraduates and one third of graduates who pursue degrees in the humanities, social sciences and sciences. The faculty has 800 professors who teach some 2,000 courses arranged in 300 undergraduate and 70 graduate programs hosted by 29 departments, 16 centres and institutes, and seven colleges.

The Department of Economics has been previously ranked as one of the top 25 worldwide economics faculty rankings, placing 23rd and 18th during the years (1995–99) and (2004–08) respectively. The Department of Philosophy ranked 15th overall in the English-speaking world and 1st in Canada in the Philosophical Gourmet Report. The Department of Sociology ranks among the top 10 in North America. In the 2010 Academic Ranking of World Universities, the Department of Computer Science placed first overall in Canada, and ranked 10th worldwide.

For the 2012–2013 entrance year, Arts had an entry average of 86.6% and Science had an entry average of 88.8%. Commerce had an entry average of 91.7%. For professional and graduate studies, admission is competitive. For 2011–2012, programs such as public policy and global affairs accept about one-tenth of applicants, though they do not have standardized admissions test requirements. Doctoral-stream master's programs had an acceptance rate of 29.6%, while doctoral programs admitted 21.5% of applicants.

Academic units

The Faculty includes 29 departments, 7 colleges, and 45 interdisciplinary centres, institutes and programs. Notable departments include:
Dunlap Institute for Astronomy & Astrophysics
Chemistry
Computer Science
Mathematics
Munk School of Global Affairs
School of the Environment

References

External links
Faculty of Arts and Science
University of Toronto Arts and Science Students' Union (ASSU) archival papers held at the University of Toronto Archives and Records Management Services
Sidney Earle Smith archival papers held at the University of Toronto Archives and Records Management Services

Arts and science, Faculty of